Aleiodes colberti is a species of parasitoid wasp in the family Braconidae. It was discovered in Ecuador.

References

Braconidae
Insects described in 2014
Invertebrates of Ecuador